The Massy Foundation is a charitable trust established in 1979 in Port of Spain.  

Christina Johnson is the director and treasurer.  It is supported by the Massy Group

It supported a Dental Health Promotion Project for Secondary School Students in Barbados in November 2018 by donated just under BDS$23000. It provided $143,983 to fund the Barbados Diabetes Reversal/Remission Study 2. 

It was one of the sponsors of the National Secondary Schools Entrepreneurship competition in Trinidad in 2018. 

Following Hurricane Maria in 2017 it supported Caribbean Life Management Solutions to visit Dominica.

It provides financial support to the Wheelchair Foundation of Barbados and the Heart & Stroke Foundation of Barbados.

References

Non-profit organisations based in Trinidad and Tobago